Kang Dae-sung (Hangul: 강대성; born April 26, 1989), better known mononymously as Daesung and his Japanese stage name D-Lite, is a South Korean singer and television personality who made his musical debut in 2006 as a member of the South Korean boy band Big Bang. He debuted as a solo artist in South Korea with the number one trot song "Look at Me, Gwisoon" in 2008. Since the inception of the Gaon Digital Chart in 2010, Daesung achieved two Top 10 songs, the digital single "Cotton Candy" and "Wings" from the BigBang album Alive (2012).

In 2013, he released his first solo album in Japan, D'scover, under  the label YGEX and embarked on his first Japanese tour. The following year, he released two more albums, D'slove and his first chart-topper, Delight. D'slove Tour made him the first Korean soloist to gather over 100,000 fans for two Japanese tours in a row. In 2017, he held his first solo Japanese dome tour, performing for over 150,000 people from four shows, and released his second number one album, D-Day, that made him the second foreign male solo artist to have two consecutive number one albums in Japan after Michael Jackson.

In South Korean television, he was a part of the main cast of the top-rated comedy show Family Outing from 2008 to 2010, the musical drama series What's Up (2011), and was one of the hosts of the talk show Night After Night (2010).

Life and career

1989–2007: Early life and debut with Big Bang

Kang Dae-sung was born in Seoul's Itaewon neighborhood, and since a young age he acquired an interest in becoming a singer. To overcome the objection of his parents who were strongly against the idea, he left home for a week to get his permission. Kang continued to pursue his goal and was recruited by YG Entertainment as a trainee after succeeding in an audition. Later, he started using his first name, Daesung, as his stage name and was paired with five more trainees (G-Dragon, T.O.P, Taeyang, Seungri and Hyunseung) to integrate the formation of the boy group Big Bang. The formation of the group was documented on television, but prior to their official debut, Jang was dropped and BigBang debuted in 2006 with five members. BigBang made their first appearance as a group on August 19, 2006, at YG Family's 10th Anniversary concert.

BigBang's debut was fairly successful, with their first studio album, Big Bang Vol.1 - Since 2007, getting sales of over 100,000 copies. The album also contains Daesung's first solo song "Try Smiling" (Korean: 웃어본다; Revised Romanization: Useo Bonda) and was preceded by three single albums: "Big Bang", "Big Bang is V.I.P" and "Big Bang 03", released the same year. The group's breakthrough came with the release of their first extended play, Always (2007), which included the number one single "Lies" (Korean: 거짓말; rr: Geojitmal). The song went on to top major Korean music charts for a record-breaking seven consecutive weeks, [3] and won the group the Song of the Year award at the 9th Mnet Korean Music Festival.[4] Their following EPs followed its predecessor's footsteps: Hot Issue yielded "Last Farewell" (Korean: 마지막 인사; rr: Majimak Insa) while Stand Up spawned "Day by Day" (Korean: 하루하루; rr: Haru Haru); both singles were chart-toppers.

Shortly after the debut of BigBang, Daesung was diagnosed with voice chord nodules and developed sociophobia and stage fright. However, he was able to recover with the help of fellow singer and label-mate Gummy, who had been previously diagnosed with the illness.

2008–2009: Solo career development, Family Outing and Cats
Daesung released his first trot single "Look at Me, Gwisoon" (Korean: 날봐, 귀순; rr: Nal Bwa Gwisun) in 2008.<ref> Mo, Shin-Jeong. [http://news.hankooki.com/lpage/sports/200806/h2008061618534591990.htm 빅뱅 대성, 트로트 싱글 '날 봐 귀순' 공개 (Big Bang's Daesung Reveals Trot Single "Nalbwa Gwisun")] . The Korea Times. June 16, 2008. Retrieved October 27, 2009.</ref> He stated that although he was worried about dampening the group's image, he wanted to try something different. The same year, he joined the SBS reality variety show Family Outing as a permanent cast member. He also made his musical debut in Korean production of Cats, playing the role of Rum Tum Tugger. Daesung then became a host for MBC's music program Show! Music Core, alongside fellow member Seungri.

Daesung released his second trot single titled "Big Hit" (Korean: 대박이야; rr: Daebakiya) in 2009. He was also scheduled to join bandmate Seungri in the autobiographical musical Shouting. In August 2009, however, Daesung was injured in a car accident shortly before the musical opened.Dae-sung to Undergo Surgery This Week. The Korea Times. August 17, 2009. Retrieved October 27, 2009. He was returning to Seoul from a filming location for Family Outing when the accident occurred on the Pyeongtaek Express highway, Gyeonggi Province. The van hit the guardrail as it skidded in the pouring rain, according to YG Entertainment. Daesung, who was in the passenger seat, broke his nose, injured his back, and sustained minor bruises on his face and arms. Daesung fully recovered and made his return to BigBang in October 2009, joining the group to perform at the Dream Concert.

2010–2012: What's Up, Night After Night and solo songs

Daesung released a new single, "Cotton Candy" (Korean: 솜사탕), at the end of January 2010. It was composed by Jung Ji-chen, with Daesung penning the lyrics.

In 2010, Daesung began his shoot for MBC's pre-produced musical drama What's Up, written by Song Ji-na. It started airing on MBN channel on December 3, 2011. "Lunatic", a track sung by Daesung for the drama's OST, was also released online on the same day. Since November 2010, Daesung also became a host for the variety-talk show Night After Night. That same year, Daesung recorded a duet with Family Outing co-star Lee Hyori titled "How Did We Get", featured on the latter's album.

In 2011, Daesung released a solo song, "Baby Don't Cry", which was included in BigBang's 4th extended play (EP). The song was first performed in Big Show 2011 concert in February. On May 31, 2011, Daesung was involved in a car accident in which a motorcyclist died. An investigation cleared the singer of charges, but he had to suspend his public activities with Big Bang for a period of time.

Daesung had his first public appearance after the incident on November 6, 2011 when he attended the MTV Europe Music Awards in Belfast, Northern Ireland. From December 2011 to January 2012, he also performed for YG Family concerts which took place in South Korea and Japan. Daesung made a comeback with the rest of the BigBang members in March 2012 with their new mini-album Alive, which includes a solo track sung by Daesung titled "Wings", an "uplifting rock ballad" that received positive reviews.

2013–2016: Solo debut in Japan, D'slove, Delight and encore concerts
Daesung released his first solo Japanese album, D'scover on February 27, 2013. It has a total of 12 tracks with mostly remakes of Japanese originals, and also includes Daesung's solo tracks, "Wings" and "Baby Don't Cry". D'scover ranked No. 2 on the Oricon Albums Chart. and also ranked No. 2 on Oricon Weekly Album Chart. It was then announced that Daesung would hold a total of four solo concerts at Kobe and Tokyo to promote the album. However, due to popular demand, an additional 21 concerts over 17 cities were added, bringing the total to 25 concerts over 18 cities. The D'scover Tour kicked off on March 23 at Kobe's World Memorial Hall and ended on June 18 at Kanagawa's Yokohama Arena, with an attendance of 100,000 fans.

In February 2014, YGEX announced that Daesung would hold a second tour in Japan. The D'slove 2014 in Japan tour kick-started on June 11, 2014 at the Yokohama Arena. On the same day, he released a mini digital album Rainy Rainy containing 4 songs to celebrate the start of his tour. The album topped Japan's iTunes charts.

Daesung released his second Japanese album, D'slove on July 16. The album ranked No. 1 on Oricon's Daily Album Chart on the day of release with a total of 30,090 copies sold. The track "I Love You", featuring Taro Hakase, was released as a physical single and peaked at number five in Oricon's Weekly Album Chart. To support his album, Daesung continued with his second Japanese tour, visiting 9 cities and drew a total of 170,000 fans from 17 shows. Daesung become the first K-pop artist to bring in more than 100,000 fans to his concert tour for two consecutive years.

On October 19, Daesung released his third Japanese EP, Delight (Japanese:『でぃらいと』). The album included 9 versions of 4 songs; containing remakes of his Korean trot singles and cover songs of famous Japanese songs from the 70s. He received good comments from the 2 original singers. Delight topped the Oricon Daily Albums Chart on the day of its release with 65,048 copies sold. The album eventually ranked No. 64 on the Oricon Yearly Album Chart with 79,000 copies sold, the highest ranking achieved by the singer so far.

To thank fans for their support, YGEX announced that Daesung would hold a solo encore concert tour in Japan. The concerts were held at Yoyogi National Stadium on January 31 and February 1, 2015 and then at Osaka-jō Hall on February 10 and 11. On the 2nd show at Yoyogi, Linda Yamamoto, who is the original singer of the song "Donimo Tomaranai", made a surprise appearance.

2017–present: Solo Dome tour, D-Day and mandatory military service
On December 2, 2016, YGEX announced that Daesung would be holding his first solo dome tour in Japan, titled the D-lite Japan Dome Tour 2017. The tour started at the Seibu Prince Dome on April 15 and 16, and was completed at the Kyocera Dome on April 22 and 23. The tour attracted 150,000 fans to the two cities. Later, YGEX announced that Daesung will embark on a nationwide hall tour named DNA Show Vol.1, with 28 shows to start on August. As more than 350,000 people applied to buy tickets to his concerts, which was six times bigger than the expected, eleven additional shows were announced, totaling 39 concerts in 18 cities, making it his biggest tour in the country. A total of 88,000 fans are expected to attended.

His second Japanese EP, named D-Day, was released simultaneously in South Korea and Japan on April 12, 2017. The album contained seven songs written and composed by top Japanese artists, including Ayaka, Hata Motohiro, Kameda Seiji, and Daesung himself. D-Day peaked at number one in the Oricon Albums Chart and on the Billboard Japan Albums chart. Daesung was featured on an official cover album of the Japanese band Dreams Come True, covering the song  which was originally released in 1990. He also released the digital EP Delight 2 on October 12, 2017, containing three covers and one original song. Upon release, the EP topped several Japanese online music services. Due to its popularity it was announced that Delight 2 would be released in a physical format on December 20 with seven additional tracks. Upon its physical release, the EP debuted at number three on Oricon, with 45,267 copies sold.

Daesung began his two-year mandatory military service on March 13, 2018 by entering the 27th Infantry Division's boot camp in Hwacheon, Gangwon Province as an active duty soldier. He was discharged on November 10, 2019 along with fellow BigBang member, Taeyang.

On July 25, 2019, was reported that a building in Gangnam, that Daesung purchased in 2017 before his military enlistment, has been operating an illegal entertainment business. The next day, Daesung released an apology statement and claimed that he was not aware of it because he started his military service right after purchasing the building and that would take legal action against tenants who committed illegal acts, such as the landlord of the building. As of January, all possible charges against him were dropped due to a lack of evidence and legitimate knowledge in the case.

Daesung opened an anonymous YouTube channel in 2020, but was discovered in March 2021. The YouTube channel is called "D'splay".

On December 26, 2022, it was confirmed by YG that Daesung had terminated his contract and was looking for a new start. However, he would still remain a member of BigBang and be opened to collaborate anytime.

Personal life
Daesung enrolled at Kyung Hee University in 2008 to study post-modern music. He is a devout Christian, and he has said that his faith was a big influence in re-evaluating his life after a car accident in 2011.

Discography

 D'scover (2013)
 D'slove'' (2014)

Filmography

Film

Television

Variety shows

Musical

Tours

 D'scover Tour 2013 in Japan (2013)
 D'slove Tour (2014–2015)
 D-lite Japan Dome Tour 2017 (2017)
 DNA Show Vol.1 (2017)

Awards and nominations

References

External links

 
 
 

1989 births
Living people
BigBang (South Korean band) members
English-language singers from South Korea
Japanese-language singers of South Korea
Kyung Hee University alumni
South Korean hip hop singers
South Korean male idols
South Korean male singers
South Korean pop singers
South Korean rhythm and blues singers
South Korean television personalities
Trot singers
YG Entertainment artists
People from Seoul
South Korean Christians
21st-century South Korean singers
Singers from Seoul
People acquitted of manslaughter
People acquitted of corruption